National leaders is the generic version of "Party and State Leaders", a political jargon used by official documents and by official media in China, referring to specific senior officials of the People's Republic of China. The range of Party and State Leaders are prescribed by the national civil servant system. Only officials holding the rank of "chief positions at the state level" (or commonly "national level" ) or "deputy positions at the state level" (or commonly "sub-national level" ) are considered Party and State Leaders.

Qualified Office Holders 
Holders of the following offices qualify as Party and State Leaders:
 Senior leaders of the three key organs of the Chinese Communist Party (CCP)
 Central Committee
 Central Politburo - Members and Alternate members
 Politburo Standing Committee - Members
 General Secretary of the Central Committee
 Secretaries of the Central Secretariat
 Central Military Commission - Chair and Vice-Chairs
 Central Commission for Discipline Inspection - Secretary
 Senior leaders of the seven key institutions of the National Government of the People's Republic of China
 National People's Congress - Chair, Vice Chairs of the Standing Committee
 President - President, Vice President
 State Council - Premier, Vice Premiers, State Councillors
 Central Military Commission - Chair and Vice-Chairs (rank: General/Admiral/Air Force General)
 National Supervisory Commission - Director (rank: Censor-General)
 Supreme People's Court - President (rank: Chief Justice)
 Supreme People's Procuratorate - Prosecutor-General (rank: Chief Procurator)
 Senior leaders of the United Front
 Chinese People's Political Consultative Conference - Chair, Vice Chairs

In addition to the holders of the above office, historically, members of the standing committee of the Central Advisory Commission (existed between 1982 and 1992) were considered Party and State Leaders. The 20 military leaders who were conferred titles of "Marshal of the People's Republic" and "Grand General of the People's Liberation Army" in 1955 were all considered former Party and State Leaders when they were alive. 

As of March 2018 (when the first session of the current 13th National People's Congress was convened), the 71 holders of the following 102 offices are considered Party and State Leaders. Of the 71 holders, 4 are women, 19 are not official members of the CCP.
 Chief positions at the state level (8)
 General Secretary of the Communist Party (1) 
 President (same holder as CCP General Secretary)
 Premier of the State Council (1)
 Chairman of the Standing Committee of the National People's Congress (1)
 Chairman of the Chinese People's Political Consultative Conference (1)
 Chairman of the Central Military Commission of the Communist Party (same holder as CCP General Secretary)
 Chairman of the Central Military Commission (same membership of the CCP Central Military Commission, same holder as CCP General Secretary)
 Members of the Politburo Standing Committee of the Chinese Communist Party (3, plus 4 holding other positions listed above)
 Vice President (1)
 Deputy positions at the state level (63)
 Members of the Politburo of the Chinese Communist Party not members of the Standing Committee (18)
 Secretaries of the Secretariat of the Chinese Communist Party (1, plus 6 who are also members of the CCP Politburo)
 Vice Chairpersons of the National People's Congress (13, plus 1 who is also a member of the CCP Politburo)
 Vice Premiers (all 4 Vice Premiers are members of the CCP Politburo) and State Councillors (5)
 Vice Chairpersons of the Central Military Commission (both members of the CCP Politburo)
 Director of the National Supervisory Commission (also a member of the CCP Politburo)
 President and Chief Justice of the Supreme People's Court (1)
 Prosecutor-General of the Supreme People's Procuratorate (1)
 Vice Chairpersons of the Chinese People's Political Consultative Conference (24)

Current national leaders

Notes

See also 
 Orders of precedence in China
 Xi–Li Administration
 Xi Jinping Administration
 Li Keqiang Government
 List of leaders of the People's Republic of China
 List of current Chinese provincial leaders

References 

China politics-related lists
Lists of leaders of China
Lists of Chinese people